Novomyrhorod Raion was a raion (district) of Kirovohrad Oblast in central Ukraine. Its administrative center was the city of Novomyrhorod. The raion was abolished on 18 July 2020 as part of the administrative reform of Ukraine, which reduced the number of raions of Kirovohrad Oblast to four. The area of Novomyrhorod Raion was merged into Novoukrainka Raion.

At the time of disestablishment, the raion consisted of one hromada, Novomyrhorod urban hromada with the administration in Novomyrhorod.

References

Former raions of Kirovohrad Oblast
1923 establishments in Ukraine
Ukrainian raions abolished during the 2020 administrative reform